The 2002 National Soccer League Grand Final was held on 12 May 2002 between Perth Glory and Olympic Sharks at Subiaco Oval. Olympic Sharks won the match 1–0, with the goal coming from Ante Milicic. Milicic also won the Joe Marston Medal.

Route to the Final

League Standings

Final Bracket

Match

Details

References 

2003 in Australian soccer
NSL Grand Finals
Soccer in Perth, Western Australia
Perth Glory FC matches
Sydney Olympic FC